Tarkio is a city in Tarkio Township, Atchison County, Missouri, United States. The population was 1,506 at the 2020 census. It was platted in 1880 and incorporated in 1881. The name "Tarkio" is from a Native American word meaning "place where walnuts grow". Historically, the economy of the city was based on agriculture and its status as a college town.

History
Tarkio was founded by Charles E. Perkins in 1880, and grew rapidly. By 1900, the U.S. Census shows 2,845 persons living in Tarkio. According to the 1910, 1920, and 1930 census, the number of residents held fairly steady for the next 30 years.

One of the community's most famous landmarks was the Tarkio Mule Barn, an octagonal brick structure built in the early 1890s. It was converted to the Tarkio Mule Barn Theatre which was used by Tarkio College. It was on the National Register of Historic Places, but the building was destroyed in a 1989 fire.

Rankin Hall and the Walnut Inn are listed on the National Register of Historic Places.

Geography and climate

Demographics

2010 census
As of the census of 2010, there were 1,583 people, 703 households, and 421 families living in the city. The racial makeup of the city was 97.9% White, 0.8% African American, 0.4% Native American, 0.4% Asian, 0.1% from other races, and 0.4% from two or more races. Hispanic or Latino of any race were 1.0% of the population.

There were 703 households, of which 25.2% had children under the age of 18 living with them, 46.9% were married couples living together, 8.0% had a female householder with no husband present, 5.0% had a male householder with no wife present, and 40.1% were non-families. 35.4% of all households were made up of individuals, and 17.1% had someone living alone who was 65 years of age or older. The average household size was 2.19 and the average family size was 2.83.

The median age in the city was 45.9 years. 20.6% of residents were under the age of 18; 6.9% were between the ages of 18 and 24; 21% were from 25 to 44; 29.1% were from 45 to 64; and 22.3% were 65 years of age or older. The gender makeup of the city was 48.3% male and 51.7% female.

2000 census
As of the census of 2000, there were 1,935 people, 749 households, and 468 families living in the city. The population density was 1,397.9 people per square mile (541.4/km). There were 843 housing units at an average density of 609.0/sq mi (235.9/km). The racial makeup of the city was 92.45% White, 6.30% African American, 0.26% Native American, 0.26% Asian, 0.36% from other races, and 0.36% from two or more races. Hispanic or Latino of any race were 0.78% of the population.

There were 749 households, out of which 27.0% had children under the age of 18 living with them, 48.1% were married couples living together, 10.0% had a female householder with no husband present, and 37.4% were non-families. 33.6% of all households were made up of individuals, and 17.9% had someone living alone who was 65 years of age or older. The average household size was 2.26 and the average family size was 2.87.

In the city the population was spread out, with 29.1% under the age of 18, 7.5% from 18 to 24, 22.9% from 25 to 44, 20.8% from 45 to 64, and 19.6% who were 65 years of age or older. The median age was 38 years. For every 100 females, there were 106.1 males. For every 100 females age 18 and over, there were 86.4 males.

The median income for a household in the city was $28,144, and the median income for a family was $34,625. Males had a median income of $26,900 versus $18,681 for females. The per capita income for the city was $14,160. About 12.4% of families and 16.3% of the population were below the poverty line, including 20.4% of those under age 18 and 15.5% of those age 65 or over.

Education
Tarkio was home to Tarkio College, a private Presbyterian college founded in 1883. The college closed in 1991. Starting in 2012 the Alumni Association rented the Campus' Main building, Rankin Hall, and in September 2019, Tarkio College Inc. was issued a Certificate of Operation from the Missouri Department of Higher Education. Operating as Tarkio Technology Institute, TTI offers technical certification courses for professionals in Plumbing, Wind Energy, and Welding.

Public library
Tarkio Branch Library is a branch of the Atchison County Library.

Notable people
One of Tarkio College's alumni was scientist Wallace Hume Carothers (1896–1937). He obtained a bachelor of science degree at the college, went on to teach at Harvard University, and is considered the "father of man-made polymers."  He is responsible for the discovery of nylon and neoprene.

Another alumnus of Tarkio College was anthropologist Edgar Lee Hewett (1865–1946), remembered for his role in bringing about the Antiquities Act that enabled preservation of archaeological sites as United States national monuments.  Hewett received his degree in pedagogy from the college, moved to Colorado and then to New Mexico, becoming the first president of the New Mexico Normal School (now New Mexico Highlands University).

Music composer Walter Greene (1910–1983), best known for his work at DePatie-Freleng Enterprises (notable works included The Pink Panther Show & The Inspector), was born in Tarkio.

David Rankin (1825–1910), the so-called "Missouri Corn King", was a resident of Tarkio. By using the latest tools and technology, Rankin was able to raise a crop of 1,000,000 bushels of corn in a single year. Rankin Hall, a building on the former Tarkio College campus, was named for the Rankin family.

U.S. Representative Sam Graves is from Tarkio, as is his brother, Todd Graves, who resigned as U.S. Attorney for the Western District of Missouri in 2006.

The album by Brewer & Shipley named Tarkio and the song Tarkio Road are named
for a regular gig they played here.

References

External links
 Tarkio, MO Official Town Website
 Snowstorm in 1881
 Historic maps of Tarkio in the Sanborn Maps of Missouri Collection at the University of Missouri

Cities in Atchison County, Missouri
Populated places established in 1880
1880 establishments in Missouri
Cities in Missouri